La Isla de los FamoS.O.S. 2, was the second season of the show La Isla de los FamoS.O.S and the fourth season of Survivor to air in Spain and it was broadcast on Antena 3 from May 7, 2003 to June 25, 2003. This season took place in the Dominican Republic. Beginning with this season there was a dramatic change in the format of the Spanish version of Survivor. Along with some of the twists introduced in the previous season, this season the sixteen contestants (seventeen when Fayna Bethencourt entered the game to replace Silvia Fominaya) were divided into two tribes called Macorix and Yamasá. When the tribes merged into the Cana'n following the sixth elimination there were only ten contestants left in the game. Along with this, all eliminations and nominations this season (and all seasons following) were live. Ultimately, it was Felipe López, the well known swimmer, who won this season over model María Pineda and took home the €200,000 grand prize.

Finishing order

Nominations table 

: Due to rule breaking, Santiago was automatically nominated for elimination during round eight.
: As the winner of the immunity challenge, Felipe was given the power to name a second nominee.
: As the winner of the immunity challenge, Felipe was given the power to name a second nominee.
: As the winner of the immunity challenge, Santiago was given the power to name a second nominee and was forced to break the tie that occurred at the tenth tribal councils.
: As the winner of the immunity challenge, María was given the power to name a second nominee.
: As the winner of the immunity challenge, Marc was given the power to name a second nominee and was forced to break the tie that occurred at the twelfth tribal councils.
: As the winner of the immunity challenge, Felipe was given the power to name a second nominee.
: As they lost the final immunity challenge, Felipe and Marc were automatically nominated for elimination.
: The lines were open to vote for the winner.

External links
https://web.archive.org/web/20030605091113/http://www.antena3tv.com/laisla/

Survivor Spain seasons
2003 Spanish television seasons